Augustinianum may refer to:

 Scholengemeenschap Augustinianum, school in Eindhoven
 Patristic Institute Augustinianum, institution in Rome
 Augustinianum (journal), published by the Patristic Institute Augustinianum